The 2022 New Mexico Attorney General election took place on November 8, 2022, to elect the next attorney general of New Mexico. Incumbent Democratic Attorney General Hector Balderas was term-limited and could not seek re-election.

Democratic primary

Candidates

Nominee
Raúl Torrez, Bernalillo County district attorney

Eliminated in primary
Brian Colón, New Mexico State Auditor

Endorsements

Debate
A debate was hosted by KRQE.

Polling

Results

Republican primary

Candidates

Declared
Jeremy Gay, U.S. Marine veteran

Results

General election

Predictions

Polling

Results

}

Notes

Partisan clients

References

External links
Official campaign websites
Jeremy Gay (R) for Attorney General
Raúl Torrez (D) for Attorney General

Attorney General
New Mexico
New Mexico Attorney General elections